John L. Scarry (May 29, 1917 – November 3, 1983) was an American professional basketball player. Scarry played in the National Basketball League for the Pittsburgh Raiders during the 1944–45 season. In six career games, he averaged 1.2 points per game. Jack Scarry was the brother of professional football player Mike Scarry.

References

1917 births
1983 deaths
American men's basketball players
Basketball players from Pennsylvania
Centers (basketball)
Duquesne Dukes men's basketball players
Forwards (basketball)
People from Duquesne, Pennsylvania
People from Palos Park, Illinois
Pittsburgh Raiders players